Kevin Kele (born 26 April 1998) is a Slovak footballer who currently plays for Austrian club SC Bad Sauerbrunn as a forward.

Club career

ŠK Slovan Bratislava
Kele made his professional Fortuna Liga's debut for ŠK Slovan Bratislava on April 20, 2016 against FC Spartak Trnava.

References

External links
 Kevin Kele at ÖFB
 
 Futbalnet profile

1998 births
Living people
Slovak footballers
Slovak expatriate footballers
Association football forwards
ŠK Slovan Bratislava players
KFC Komárno players
FK Slovan Duslo Šaľa players
2. Liga (Slovakia) players
Slovak Super Liga players
People from Nové Zámky
Sportspeople from the Nitra Region
Slovak expatriate sportspeople in Austria
Expatriate footballers in Austria